The dorsal talonavicular ligament is a broad, thin band, which connects the neck of the talus to the dorsal surface of the navicular bone; it is covered by the Extensor tendons.

The plantar calcaneonavicular supplies the place of a plantar ligament for this joint.

References 

Ligaments of the lower limb